Neusticurus surinamensis, the red neusticurus, is a species of lizard in the family Gymnophthalmidae. It is native to Brazil .

Taxonomy 
Neusticurus surinamensis is a species from the genus Neusticurus and was first described by this scientific name by  Lorenz Müller, who described a specimen found near Albina, a border town in Suriname.   The species is also known by its synonym Neusticurus rudis

Range 
Neusticurus surinamensis has been observed in Suriname, Brazil, and French Guiana. Others generalize the range to all of northern South America

References

Neusticurus
Reptiles of Brazil
Endemic fauna of Brazil
Reptiles described in 1923
Taxa named by Lorenz Müller